The women's long jump at the 2022 Commonwealth Games, as part of the athletics programme, took place in the Alexander Stadium on 5 and  7 August 2022.

Records
Prior to this competition, the existing world and Games records were as follows:

Schedule
The schedule was as follows:

All times are British Summer Time (UTC+1)

Results

Qualification
Qualifying performance 6.75 (Q) or at least 12 best performers (q) advance to the Final

Final
The medals were determined in the final.

References

Women's long jump
2022
2022 in women's athletics